Sacred and Profane Love is a 1921 American silent drama film produced by Famous Players-Lasky and distributed by Paramount Pictures. This film was directed by William Desmond Taylor and starred Elsie Ferguson with Conrad Nagel. It is based on a book The Book of Carlotta by Arnold Bennett and was turned into a 1920 Broadway play which also starred Elsie Ferguson. Writer/director Julia Crawford Ivers adapted the book and play to the screen while her son James Van Trees served as one of the film's cinematographers. All known copies of this film are lost.

Plot
As described in a film publication summary, Carlotta Peel (Ferguson), brought up by a maiden aunt with maiden ideas, secretly attends a concert by Emilie Diaz (Nagel). After the concert she meets the pianist and later succumbs to the strains of "Samson and Delilah" played by Emilie. Carlotta spends the night with Emilie and returns home the next morning to find her aunt dead. She does not see Emilie again, and after several years she is a well known novelist who is loved by her publisher, Frank Ispenlove (Holding). The publisher's wife Mary (Greenwood) commits suicide because of her husband's affair with Carlotta. Frank then kills himself. After some time Carlotta finds Emilie living in Paris, a morphine addict, originally prescribed for his tremors. She nurses him back to health and his musical gift is restored. She is now happy with her first love.

Cast
Elsie Ferguson as Carlotta Peel
Conrad Nagel as Emilie Diaz, pianist
Thomas Holding as Frank Ispenlove
Helen Dunbar as Constance Peel
Winifred Greenwood as Mary Ispenlove
Raymond Blathwayt as Lord Francis Alcar
Clarissa Selwynne as Mrs. Sardis
Howard Gaye as Albert Vicary
Forrest Stanley as Samson
Jane Keckley as Rebecca
Barbara Gurney as A Parlor Maid

References

External links

Elsie Ferguson and Conrad Nagel in a scene
Production still (archived)
 Getty Images

1921 films
American silent feature films
Famous Players-Lasky films
Films based on works by Arnold Bennett
American films based on plays
Films directed by William Desmond Taylor
Lost American films
American romantic drama films
Films based on multiple works
American black-and-white films
1921 romantic drama films
1921 lost films
Silent romantic drama films
1920s American films
Silent American drama films